Belinda Bencic was the 2013 champion, but she did not defend her title after receiving a place in the women's singles main draw.

Darya Kasatkina won the title, defeating Ivana Jorović in the final, 6–7(5–7), 6–2, 6–3.

Seeds

Main draw

Finals

Top half

Section 1

Section 2

Bottom half

Section 3

Section 4

External links 
 Main draw

Girls' Singles
French Open, 2014 Girls' Singles